West Virginia Route 83 is an east–west state highway located within McDowell County, West Virginia. The western terminus is at the Virginia state line six miles (10 km) west of Jolo, where WV 83 continues west as Virginia State Route 83. The eastern terminus is at West Virginia Route 16 in War.

WV 83 is slated to be replaced by the Coalfields Expressway.

Major intersections

References

083
Transportation in McDowell County, West Virginia